Kirkburton is a civil parish in the metropolitan borough of Kirklees, West Yorkshire, England. It contains 164 listed buildings that are recorded in the National Heritage List for England. Of these, two are listed at Grade I, the highest of the three grades, two are at Grade II*, the middle grade, and the others are at Grade II, the lowest grade. The list also includes two listed buildings outside the parish but in Kirkburton ward; both of these are at Grade II. There are no major towns in the parish, but it contains villages and smaller settlements including Farnley Tyas, Flockton, Flockton Green, Grange Moor, Highburton, Kirkheaton, Lepton, Shelley, Shepley, Stocksmoor, Thunder Bridge, and Thurstonland. The parish is otherwise rural.

Until the Industrial Revolution the economy of the parish depended mainly on agriculture, and many of the listed buildings are farmhouses and farm buildings. The Industrial Revolution brought the woollen industry to the area, and this was initially a domestic process. Many of the listed buildings are weavers' cottages and other houses used for spinning wool, and these are characterised by long rows of mullioned windows, mainly in the upper storeys. Most of the listed buildings are constructed from stone and have roofs of stone slate. The other listed buildings include other houses and associated structures, churches, chapels and Sunday schools, items in churchyards, a village cross, public houses, milestones, mile posts, guide posts, and boundary stones, bridges, a stone tower, mills, a school, and a war memorial.


Key

Buildings

References

Citations

Sources

Lists of listed buildings in West Yorkshire